Juan Manuel Cardona Bonilla (Espartinas, province of Seville, October 3, 1941-Barcelona, October 16, 2014), better known by his stage name Payo Juan Manuel, was a Spanish singer, guitarist and composer of gypsy origin.

Biography 
Born in Espartinas (province of Seville), early his family emigrated to Barcelona where he began to train musically and recorded his first songs. In the 1980s, he moved to Jaén, where he spent much of the rest of his life and continued his artistic career, combined with the attention to his bar "El Rincón del Payo" located in the capital of Jaén.

Considered as a very prolific singer of flamenco and Catalan rumba, with more than 700 songs, much of his popularity was due to songs like Una vieja y un viejo and his appearance on television programs such as Crónicas marcianas.

He died on October 16, 2014 at the age of 73 in the city of Barcelona. He was buried in Santa Coloma de Gramanet according to his will.

Partial discography 
Sola, Sola Está (Discophon, 1972).
Haiki, tu mandas (Discophon, 1972)
Rincón de España (Discophon, 1973)
Makuka (Discophon, 1974)
Rumbas del Payo Juan Manuel (Discophon, 1974)
El Chinito / Que Te Estas Pasando (Zartos, 1975)
Lairo Lairo / Playas Catalanas (Zartos, 1975)
Enróllate María (Urogallo, 1978)
Una Vieja Y Un Viejo Se Van P'al Banco... (Discobal, 1981)
Dallas "Follón" (Olympo, 1982)
Son Son Sera - Hot Mix Rumba (Vidisco, 1989)
El Rumbero Verde (Vale Music, recopilatorio, 2004)

References 

Flamenco singers
Spanish composers